2002 Milan Indoor, Paul Haarhuis and Sjeng Schalken were the defending champions but lost in the semifinals to Julien Boutter and Max Mirnyi.

Karsten Braasch and Andrei Olhovskiy won in the final 3–6, 7–6(7–5), [12–10] against Boutter and Mirnyi.

Seeds

  Paul Haarhuis /  Sjeng Schalken (semifinals)
  David Adams /  David Macpherson (first round)
  Leoš Friedl /  Radek Štěpánek (quarterfinals)
  Marius Barnard /  Cyril Suk (first round)

Draw

External links
 2002 Milan Indoor Doubles Draw

Milan Indoor
2002 ATP Tour
Milan